George Colville (1876–1928) was a Scottish professional footballer. A right half, he played in the Football League for Blackpool and Glossop North End.

References

1876 births
1928 deaths
People from Tarbolton
Scottish footballers
Blackpool F.C. players
Hibernian F.C. players
Fulham F.C. players
Association football wing halves
Glossop North End A.F.C. players
English Football League players
Port Glasgow Athletic F.C. players